Two ships and one shore establishment of the Royal Australian Navy (RAN) have been named HMAS Huon, after the Huon River in Tasmania.

, a River-class torpedo boat destroyer operating from 1915 until 1928, and sunk as a target in 1931
, the main naval facility in Tasmania from 1901 to 1994
, the lead ship of the Huon-class minehunters, which entered service in 1999, and is active as of 2016

Battle honours
Ships named HMAS Huon are entitled to carry a single battle honour:
Adriatic 1917–18

References

Royal Australian Navy ship names